The Taipei Metro VAL 256 is the first generation of automated guideway transit rolling stock to be used on the Wenhu (Brown) line of Taipei Metro.

A total of 51 2-car train sets were built by GEC Alsthom from 1989 to 1993, for a total of 102 cars. They entered service in 1996 as the first trains on the newly opened Metro system. They are part of the VAL family of automated, driverless rubber-tired metros developed by the French company Matra. Each four-car train is formed by two coupled two-car trainsets. Any two sets can be coupled and their numbers do not need to be consecutive, unlike heavy-capacity trains.

Within a year of revenue operations, Matra terminated the service contract, removing all maintenance crew. They filed and won a complaint against the Taipei City Government over contract compensation delay. The VAL 256 trains remained in service for twelve more years, serviced by TRTC engineers and Academia Sinica researchers.

The VAL 256 cars originally employed a fixed-block ATC/ATO system derived from the MAGGALY technology found on Lyon Metro Line D. When the Muzha/Wenshan line was extended into Neihu in June 2003, Bombardier Transportation was contracted to replace the Matra-based system with its own, computerized, moving block CITYFLO 650 CBTC system, and overhauling the older Matra cars to function under the new system.  This took place over a period of 17 months and all 51 sets returned to service in December 2010.

Bombardier's contract also involved supplying 101 newly built vehicles to expand the existing fleet. Integration of the Bombardier-built cars with the Matra-built cars led to multiple system malfunctions and failures along the Wenshan and Neihu Lines.

The VAL 256 cars were also used by O'Hare International Airport's Airport Transit System, albeit with the majority of the seats removed since the system's primary purpose is to move passengers between terminals as well as provide access to the economy parking lots, rental car facility, and the Metra station.

See also 
 List of driverless trains
 Taipei Metro C301
 Taipei Metro C321
 Taipei Metro C341
 Taipei Metro C371
 Taipei Metro BT370
 Taipei Metro C381

References

External links
 (includes the O'Hare ATS VAL 256)

Electric multiple units of Taiwan
Taipei Metro
VAL people movers
Electric multiple units of the United States
750 V DC multiple units